Xenorhina is a genus of microhylid frogs. The genus is endemic to New Guinea. They are sometimes known as the snouted frogs or fanged frogs, the latter referring to the now-synonymized genus Xenobatrachus.

Species
There are 40 species:

References

 
Microhylidae
Amphibian genera
Endemic fauna of New Guinea
Taxa named by Wilhelm Peters